Lengshuitan District is one of two urban districts of Yongzhou City, Hunan Province, China. It is located on the north of the city proper,  and lies to the eastern border of Guangxi.

The district is bordered to the northwest and the north by Dong'an County, to the northeast and the east by Qidong and Qiyang Counties, to the south by Lingling District. Lengshuitan District has 8 subdistricts, 8 towns ( and 3 townships) under its jurisdiction, the government seat is Wutong.

Administrative divisions
8 subdistricts
 Fenghuang
 Lingjiaoshan
 Meiwan
 Quhe
 Shanhu
 Wutong
 Xiaojiayuan
 Yangjiaqiao

8 townships
 Caishi
 Gaoxishi
 Gaoyangsi
 Huaqiaojie
 Niujiaoba
 Puliqiao
 Shanglingqiao
 Yitang

1 township
 Yangcundian

References

External links
Official website of Lengshuitan District Government

 
County-level divisions of Hunan
Yongzhou